Belgium competed in every Junior Eurovision Song Contest before withdrawing 2013.

History
Belgium are one of the sixteen countries to have made their debut at the inaugural  contest, which took place on 15 November 2003 at the Forum in Copenhagen, Denmark.

National selection
Two broadcasters were once responsible for the Belgium entry at Junior Eurovision - as for the Eurovision Song Contest, both Flemish broadcaster Vlaamse Radio- en Televisieomroep (VRT) and Walloon broadcaster Radio télévision belge de la communauté française (RTBF) were responsible for organising the Belgian entry for Junior Eurovision. The two broadcasters shared responsibility, with VRT organising one year, and RTBF organising the following year.

2005 marked a change to the format, with both broadcasters organising one national final due to the  contest being held in the Belgian city of Hasselt. Each broadcaster chose six songs to compete in one national final, with the final winner representing Belgium at the contest. The winner was Lindsay Daenen with "Mes rêves". 2006 returned to the previous format, with VRT organising the entry. Following this RTBF decided to withdraw from Junior Eurovision due to a lack of interest for the contest in Wallonia and in RTBF. This gave VRT total control of Belgium's Junior Eurovision entry.

However, since 2006 all Belgian entries have been in Dutch. In 2010, Belgium sent a duo for the first time since their debut. Belgium was also the first country who confirmed to participate in Junior Eurovision Song Contest 2011 and 2012.

Withdrawal
On 26 March 2013, Flemish broadcaster, VRT, announced that Belgium will withdraw from the contest in 2013 in order to launch a new show for young performs in Belgium. However, they held a national final called , which was won by then 14-year-old Pieter Vreys. On 20 December 2013, Belgium's Flemish TV channel Ketnet announced that they are no longer interested in Junior Eurovision and decided not to make a comeback.

Participation overview

Commentators and spokespersons

The contests are broadcast online worldwide through the official Junior Eurovision Song Contest website junioreurovision.tv and YouTube. In 2015, the online broadcasts featured commentary in English by junioreurovision.tv editor Luke Fisher and 2011 Bulgarian Junior Eurovision Song Contest entrant Ivan Ivanov. The Belgian broadcasters, VRT and RTBF, send their own commentator to each contest in order to provide commentary in Dutch and French. Spokespersons were also chosen by the national broadcaster in order to announce the awarding points from Belgium. The table below list the details of each commentator and spokesperson since 2003.

Hostings

See also
Belgium in the Eurovision Song Contest – Senior version of the Junior Eurovision Song Contest.
Belgium in the Eurovision Young Dancers – A competition organised by the EBU for younger dancers aged between 16 and 21.
Belgium in the Eurovision Young Musicians – A competition organised by the EBU for musicians aged 18 years and younger.

Notes and references

Notes

References

Countries in the Junior Eurovision Song Contest
Belgian music